A marketplace is a location where people regularly gather for the purchase and sale of provisions, livestock, and other goods.

Marketplace may also refer to:

Health
Health insurance marketplace, previously known as health insurance exchange, a set of government-regulated and standardized health care plans in the United States

Media
Marketplace (Canadian TV program), a Canadian consumer advocacy newsmagazine television program which has been broadcast on CBC since 1972
Marketplace (Irish TV programme), a 1987–1996 Irish finance and business current affairs television programme that aired on RTÉ
Marketplace (radio program), an American radio program that has been broadcast since 1989
The Marketplace (series), an erotic novel series
"Marketplace" (song), a 1985 song by the American punk rock band the Proletariat

Places
Market square, an area in a town
The Marketplace Mall, a shopping mall near Rochester, New York
The Market Place (Orange County, California), a shopping mall in Tustin and Irvine, California
Market Place (Finchley), a road and former pig market in Finchley, London
The MarketPlace, a grocery store chain
Market Place, a section of the A1 road in London
Victoria Square, Christchurch, previously known as Market Place

Technology
Online marketplace, in e-commerce, such as an online trading community and online auctions

Other uses
Lotus Marketplace, a database program
Second Life Marketplace, online shopping site for Second Life
Windows Phone Marketplace
Xbox Live Marketplace

See also
Market (disambiguation), a word sometimes interchangeable with "marketplace"
Marketplace Mall (disambiguation)